The Europa rocket was an early expendable launch system of the European Launcher Development Organisation (ELDO), which was the precursor to the European Space Agency (ESA). It was developed with the aim to delivering space access technology, and more specifically to facilitate the deployment of European-wide telecommunication and meteorological satellites into orbit.

The program ultimately traces its history to the British Blue Streak missile, which was cancelled in 1960. Blue Streak was then used as the basis of the Black Prince expendable launch system and several other concepts. Looking for partners to share development costs, ELDO was formed and began development of the Europa using the Blue Streak first stage along with the French-built Coralie second stage and German Astris upper stage.

The programme proceeded to perform multiple test launches but these frequently resulted in partial failures. In addition, Britain decided to pull out of the ELDO organisation, and thus Europa, to focus on the rival all-British Black Arrow launcher instead. Confidence in the programme had diminished due to the poor reliability figures, and this led to its termination.

Although the UK left the program, the other ELDO partners were still interested in a launcher. They re-formed as the European Space Agency (ESA) in 1974 and proceeded to develop the Ariane family of launchers, which would prove to be a commercial success with hundreds of launches performed.

Development

Background
During the early 1950s, the British government had identified the need to develop its own series of ballistic missiles due to advances being made in this field, particularly by the Soviet Union and the United States. A British programme to develop such a missile, named Blue Streak, was promptly initiated; however, there were key questions over the then-relatively unknown scenario of what such a vehicle would encounter when attempting re-entry to the atmosphere, there were fears that such a vehicle might simply burn up like a meteor and therefore be unachievable. Accordingly, during 1955, the Black Knight research rocket programme was commenced for this purpose. Following several launches, the Black Knight came to be regarded as a successful programme, having produced a relatively low cost and reliable rocket, and thus there was impetus present to proceed with further development of the platform.

On 13 April 1960, the Defence Minister Harold Watkinson announced the cancellation of Blue Streak as a military programme, and went on to state that: "the Government will now consider with the firms and other interests concerned, as a matter of urgency, whether the Blue Streak programme could be adapted for the development of a launcher for space satellites." While development of the Blue Streak missile continued with the view of using it as a capable satellite launcher, the rate of work was substantially slowed. Aerospace author C.N. Hill wrote that this declaration had been made: "Mainly, I suspect, to minimise the political damage that ensued from the [Blue Streak] decision".

In 1957, a proposed design, known as Black Prince, was put forward by Desmond King-Hele and Doreen Gilmour of the Royal Aircraft Establishment (RAE) during 1957. As envisioned by this proposal, an expendable launch system could be developed using a mix of preexisting and in-development assets; the multi-stage launcher was to be formed of a Blue Streak first stage, a Black Knight (or later a Black Arrow) second stage, and a military solid rocket as a third stage.

In 1960, the Royal Aircraft Establishment at Farnborough was given the job of considering how the Blue Streak missile could be adapted as a satellite launching vehicle, in conjunction with other rocket stages. Accordingly, the 1957 concept design for a combined Blue Streak-Black Knight launcher was put forward once again, and this time received a favourable appraisal; the project was assigned the rainbow code of Black Prince; in official documentation, the platform was referred to as the Blue Streak Satellite Launch Vehicle (BSSLV). However, it was quickly recognised that the programme's cost would be a major issue, one estimate of the total development costs would have been equal of half of the Britain's university budget.

Along with the high costs involved, it was becoming clear that, due to British military satellites already being delivered by American launchers and the domestic science community being perceived as lacking the funding to conduct multiple major research satellite programmes at once, that domestic demand for such a launcher was not guaranteed. Accordingly, it was decided that it would be preferable for other nations to be involved in the programme in order to share the burden of the costs and to be predisposed to making use of the launcher. Diplomatic approaches were made to various nations, however it became obvious that the members of the Commonwealth of Nations alone were not prepared to provide the necessary backing for such a programme.

Collaboration
As early as 1961, Peter Thorneycroft, the Minister of Aviation, had been giving some thought on the topic of a joint European project, the main intention of this ambition being to not waste the advanced development of the Blue Streak, and to also not leave space exploration to the Americans and Russians. Britain also made diplomatic approaches to various European nations, the most significant of these being to France. Overtures between the British government and the French government on potential cooperation on missile research, and specifically on the potential use of the Blue Streak as early as 1957. Britain and France came to a mutual agreement to serve as the join lead nations on the envisioned programme, while also recognising that other partner nations would be necessary.

Both France and Britain approached various other nations to join on the collaborative programme, however negotiations with interested nations were often protracted, in part due to there having been a prevailing attitude of scepticism; author C.N. Hill stated that "many countries thought that the U.K. was seeking to foist an obsolescent launch vehicle on them, and making them pay the costs". The participation of many nations hinged upon gaining the endorsement of Germany, who was eventually won over and chose to participate. As a result of this diplomacy, it was decided to proceed with the formation of the European Launcher Development Organisation (ELDO) group.

Headquartered in Paris, the founding members of the ELDO were Belgium, France, the United Kingdom, Italy, the Netherlands and West Germany; while Australia, Spain, Switzerland, Norway, and Sweden had chosen to decline participation. The ELDO not only served the purpose of harnessing Blue Streak, but also fulfilled ambitions to produce a European rival to the American and Soviet launchers being developed and deployed at that time. In response to the rise of the ELDO initiative, work on the competing Black Prince launcher gradually came to a halt as attention from the British government drifted towards European collaboration.

Following the study of various designs and concepts, the ELDO arrived at a three-stage approach which was given the designation Eldo A, this was later formally named as Europa. According to Hill, the Black Prince and Europa were comparable launchers capable to delivering similar performance and roughly the same payloads, the overlap leaving little room for both programmes. However, there was criticisms that Europa would take longer to deliver than the Black Prince launcher for no significant improvement, while suffering from the same core economic problem of being too expensive for scientific satellites while too small for commercial communications satellites.

In January 1965, the French thought the initial three-stage rocket design would not be sufficiently advanced to carry the size of payloads required, while another rocket – referred to as Eldo B – which featured liquid hydrogen-fuelled second and third stages, came to be viewed as being a superior design, partly due to reduce the cost of the project via the elimination of transition test launchers. It would still use the Blue Streak as the first stage. The ELDO later disagreed, but the French would ultimately get their way when Eldo B became the foundation for the later Ariane launcher, which would first launch in 1979.

Rising costs and restructuring
By April 1966, the project's estimated costs had increased to £150 million from an initial estimate of £70 million. By this point, hopes amongst several of the participants were not high that Europa would be suitable for the envisioned task; the Italians wanted to abandon the ELDO and instead participate in a single European space organisation that would not be as nationally divided as the ELDO. The first launch had been originally planned for November 1966; however, the first two-stage launch occurred in August 1967, while the full three stages (Europa 1) performed its first combined launch in November 1968.

During the mid-1960s, Britain had been contributing 40 per cent of the programme's costs. In early June 1966, the British government (Fred Mulley) decided it could not afford the cost of Europa and sought to leave the ELDO organisation – one of the few European organisations by which point it had become a lead player. Britain's contribution was reduced to 27 per cent. This was also at a time when satellite technology was on the verge of changing the world. However, the soon-to-be-common geosynchronous satellites necessitated being positioned at an altitude of 22,000 miles (35 400 km) above Earth, which was far beyond the performance of Europa 1, being capable of launching satellites to a  altitude.

In November 1968, a European Space Conference held in Bonn decided on a proposal to merge the ELDO with the ESRO, forming a pan-European space authority by early 1970; known as the European Space Agency (ESA), this organisation would not be formed until 1975. Britain was lukewarm to the idea and did not believe that Europe could launch satellites economically. By 1970, the French launch base in French Guiana had cost £45 million, and in that year France became the most important partner in the project, then planning to build two-thirds of the rocket as well as owning the launch site. Although only on paper, Britain's involvement in the project has been much reduced, after being largely responsible (with an Australian launch site) for getting the entire project going in the first place. However, all of the launchers, to the very end of the programme, were completely dependent on the British rocket used for the first stage.

By 1970, the project was under a perceived economic threat from America's offer to fly satellites for foreign powers on a reimbursable basis. That agreement had been signed between ESRO and NASA on 30 December 1966 and by 1970 it was becoming clear that the advantage in having a national launch vehicle was insufficient to justify the cost. In 1972, NASA approved development of the reusable Space Shuttle, which at that time was largely perceived to eventually offer greater savings over the launching of satellites using an expendable system. These hopes the Shuttle delivering lower costs would ultimately prove to be hollow. By 1971, over £250 million had been spent on the Europa programme; the Europa 2 itself cost over £4 million.

On 27 April 1973, Europa was abandoned. On 21 September 1973, the legal agreement for the L3S, which later became known as the Ariane 1, was signed. Under this agreement, the Europa III was formally cancelled, while the L3S would be developed as a multinational project. From the onset, this new launcher was to be developed for the purpose of sending commercial satellites into geosynchronous orbit, unlike many other competing launchers, which had been typically developed for other purposes and subsequently adapted, such as ballistic missiles.

Division of labour

Workshare on the programme was a politically charged matter. Tasks were to be distributed between nations: the United Kingdom would provide the first stage (derived from the Blue Streak missile), France would build the second and Germany would construct the third stage. It would carry a satellite, which would be designed and manufactured in Italy, and weighted roughly a ton. The telemetry was to be developed by the Netherlands, while Belgium was to develop the downrange ground guidance system.

By 1969, the ELDO was beginning to realize that dividing work up by country led to not enough overall collaboration and had resulted in a disjointed framework of planning. This disjointed structure has been accredited as having been responsible for the lack of successful launch. In effect, there had been no single authority or group that was entirely responsible or in control of Europa. Notably, in November 1971, the West Germans publicly blamed the failure and explosion of Europa 2 upon immense divisions within ELDO.

Programme stages
The Europa programme was divided into 4 separate projects intended to follow each other in succession. Ultimately, only two of these projects would have any launches conducted, the third project being cancelled while the fourth remained a case study only:

 Europa 1: 4 unsuccessful launches
 Europa 2: 1 unsuccessful launch
 Europa 3: Cancelled before any launch occurred
 Europa 4: Study only, later cancelled

Design

Payloads
The payload for the rocket was overseen by the European Space Research Organization – ESRO. ESRO organised the development of early satellites such as ESRO 2B (Iris), built by Hawker Siddeley Dynamics and Engins Matra.

In 1967, it was decided the payloads were to be launched by 1970 from French Guiana, not Australia. In April 1969, Britain decided to invest in a satellite television project by the European Broadcasting Union.

By the early 1970s the French-German Symphonie communications satellite were in production, but by then Europa was cancelled in November 1971.

First stage
It was tested three times in 1964, and also in 1965, with dummy upper stages in 1965. It was assisted by the British National Committee for Space Research. The chief project engineer of the rocket's assembly at the space projects division of Hawker Siddeley Dynamics was Dr Geoffrey Pardoe, also the project manager of Blue Streak from 1956 to 1960 (when under de Havilland). In August 1965, the Blue Streak was tested (static firing trial) with (complete full-weight) dummy upper stages at RAF Spadeadam (the site was owned by Rolls-Royce), with first successful firing on 23 September 1965 lasting 135 seconds. Five days later the site was visited by the Minister of Aviation, Roy Jenkins.

In January 1966, it had been transported to Adelaide, Australia, for launches later that year. Also in the UK in 1967 the go-ahead had been given for the UK's (separately developed) three-stage Black Arrow rocket launcher (made by Westland Aircraft, with Bristol Siddeley rocket engines developed at the Rocket Propulsion Establishment at Westcott, Buckinghamshire) – Britain did not need to rely on Europa, and Black Arrow would be ready first. Britain then withdrew from ELDO, to concentrate on the Black Arrow, but was committed to supplying ELDO with two Blue Streak rocket stages a year until 1976. At this time in 1969, Britain was spending £30 million a year on space, controlled from the Space Division of the Ministry of Technology. Britain was still dealing with, and funding, ESRO.

By 1970, Hawker Siddeley's Blue Streak launcher had cost £100 million to develop. Blue Streak was used for the Europa 2's one and only launch on 5 November 1971.

Second stage

The French had developed rockets through their Véronique, which was originally planned to be the second stage.

The Coralie was to be tested at Colomb-Béchar in the Béchar Province of western Algeria. Tests began in December 1965 at Vernon, Eure in France, west of Paris. The first successful firing was on 28 November 1966 in northern Africa.

Société Européenne de Propulsion (SEP), at Vernon, would later develop the Viking main engines for Ariane.

Third stage

This was made in Germany by Entwicklungsring Nord (ERNO Raumfahrttechnik GmbH), based in Bremen, from 1969. The German consortium itself was known as Arbeitsgemeinschaft Satellitenträgersystem (ASAT), which consisted of ERNO and MBB. Although assembled by ERNO in Bremen, the engine was made by Société d'Etudes pour la Propulsion par Réaction (SEPR), part of Snecma in Villaroche.

On 2 July 1969, on a launch at Woomera of the three-stage  rocket, the Astris third stage failed to light, after the other two had successfully fired.

After the third stage, an apogee kick motor would be used to put a satellite into a synchronous orbit.

ERNO would later develop the second stage for the Ariane launcher, at the Vereinigte Flugtechnische Werke (VFW) factory in Bremen, later owned by Daimler Benz Aerospace then DaimlerChrysler Aerospace (DASA).

Operational history
The first test took place at 9:14am local time on 5 June 1964 at Woomera. Thrust was terminated after 147 seconds, 6 seconds earlier than planned. The craft's structure was built by Hawker Siddeley Dynamics and the rocket engine were the Rolls-Royce RZ.2. At this stage the French and German rocket stages were mere fibre-glass scale models.

The first full-size launch, weighing in total 104 tons, took place at Woomera on 24 May 1966, with dummy upper stages. Tests were conducted by Australia's Weapons Research Establishment and the French Laboratoire de Recherche en Balistique et Aérodynamique (based at Vernon). After two minutes and fifteen seconds, six seconds short of the planned flight, the rocket was destroyed because an impact predictor reported it to be veering west of the planned trajectory.

Two-stage testing was planned for June 1967. At 11:12pm GMT on 29 November 1968, the first three-stage Europa 1 launcher failed to put a  Italian satellite-model into orbit.

The first launch from French Guiana on 5 November 1971 was also the first launch of the four-stage Europa 2. It exploded over the Atlantic after three minutes.

Overall, the Europa programme had been heavily marred by technical problems. Although the first stage (the British Blue Streak) had launched successfully on each occasion, either the second or third stage would fail during every time, preventing a fully successful launch from being achieved. This disappointing performance heavily contributed to work on the programme being terminated.

Europa rocket launches

References

Citations

Bibliography

 
 
 
 
 Hill, C.N. "A Vertical Empire: The History of the UK Rocket and Space Programme, 1950–1971." World Scientific, 2001. .
 Laycock, Stuart and Philip Laycock. "Unexpected Britain." ''Amberley Publishing Limited, 2014. .

External links

 
 

1967 in spaceflight
1971 in spaceflight
Space launch vehicles of Europe
Space launch vehicles of France
Space launch vehicles of the United Kingdom
Space programme of the United Kingdom
Cancelled space launch vehicles